Hyaloctoides bioculatus is a species of tephritid or fruit flies in the genus Hyaloctoides of the family Tephritidae.

Distribution
Nigeria.

References

Tephritinae
Taxa named by Mario Bezzi
Insects described in 1920
Diptera of Africa